Beijing Polybona Film Distribution Co. Ltd., also known as Polybona Films or the Bona Film Group, is a Chinese production company and distributor of films from mainland China and Hong Kong. It is run as a subsidiary of the China Poly Group, and is one of China's largest share-holding film distribution companies.

It was named "the Chinese Miramax" by Screen International in 2005, and its CEO, Yu Dong, was described as one of "the future’s most influential filmmakers" by The Hollywood Reporter in November 2006.

History
Founded in 1999, Polybona was the first domestic private firm to receive a film distribution license from the SARFT. In November 2003, it merged with the China Poly Group, a wealthy business conglomerate wing of the Chinese military, the People's Liberation Army, to form PolyBona Film Distribution.

The company has distributed over 120 domestic and foreign films, including Confession of Pain, Protégé, The Myth, Initial D, and Dragon Tiger Gate, generating over RMB 1 billion (approximately US$130 million) in box office revenue, capturing over 20% of the overall market share for five years running.

It has also co-produced over 20 feature films, including The Warlords, Red Cliff, Flash Point, and After This Our Exile.

In 2007, Variety recognized the successful growth of Polybona Films, and wrote highly about its transforming from Miramax to Paramount.

In 2014, the company had a 10% share of the Chinese box office, earning  from 12 films released.

In 2014, the company was the fourth-largest film distributor in China, with 5.99% of the market.

As of April 2015, the company was worth US$542 million.

In Q1 of 2015, it had a gross profit of US$45 million, a revenue of US$117.6 million, and a box office gross of US$257 million.

In November 2015, it was reported that Bona invested  in TSG Entertainment, resulting in a stake in six films distributed by 20th Century Fox, including The Martian (2015).

Filmography

Released

References

External links

Official Website

Companies formerly listed on the Nasdaq
Film production companies of China
Mass media companies established in 1999
Chinese companies established in 1999
Companies based in Beijing
Film distributors of China